Dumontia may refer to:
 Dumontia (alga), a genus of algae in the family Dumontiaceae
 Dumontia (crustacean), a genus of crustaceans in the family Dumontiidae